Rabanus Maurus Magnentius ( 780 – 4 February 856), also known as Hrabanus or Rhabanus, was a Frankish Benedictine monk, theologian, poet, encyclopedist and military writer who became archbishop of Mainz in East Francia. He was the author of the encyclopaedia De rerum naturis ("On the Natures of Things"). He also wrote treatises on education and grammar and commentaries on the Bible. He was one of the most prominent teachers and writers of the Carolingian age, and was called "Praeceptor Germaniae", or "the teacher of Germany". In the most recent edition of the Roman Martyrology (Martyrologium Romanum, 2004, pp. 133), his feast is given as 4 February and he is qualified as a Saint ('sanctus').

Life

Rabanus was born of noble parents in Mainz. The date of his birth remains uncertain, but in 801 he was ordained a deacon at Benedictine Abbey of Fulda in Hesse, where he had been sent to school and had become a monk. At the insistence of Ratgar, his abbot, he went together with Haimo (later of Halberstadt) to complete his studies at Tours. There he studied under Alcuin, who in recognition of his diligence and purity gave him the surname of Maurus, after the favourite disciple of Benedict, Saint Maurus.

Returning to Fulda, in 803 he was entrusted with the principal charge of the abbey school, which under his direction became one of the most preeminent centers of scholarship and book production in Europe, and sent forth such pupils as Walafrid Strabo, Servatus Lupus of Ferrières, and Otfrid of Weissenburg. It was probably at this period that he compiled his excerpt from the grammar of Priscian, a popular textbook during the Middle Ages. According to Alban Butler's Lives of the Saints, Rabanus ate no meat and drank no wine.

In 814 Rabanus was ordained a priest. Shortly afterwards, apparently on account of disagreement with Abbot Ratgar, he withdrew for a time from Fulda. This banishment has long been understood to have occasioned a pilgrimage to Palestine, based on an allusion in his commentary on Joshua. However, the passage in question is taken from Origen's Homily xiv In Librum Jesu Nave. Hence, it was Origen, not Rabanus, who visited Palestine. Rabanus returned to Fulda in 817 on the election of a new abbot, Eigil, and at Eigil's death in 822, Rabanus himself became abbot. He handled this position efficiently and successfully, but in 842 he resigned so as to have greater leisure for study and prayer, retiring to the neighbouring monastery of St Petersberg.

In 847 Rabanus was constrained to return to public life when he was elected to succeed Otgar as Archbishop of Mainz. He died at Winkel on the Rhine in 856.

Hymns
Rabanus composed a number of hymns, the most famous of which is the Veni Creator Spiritus. This is a hymn to the Holy Spirit often sung at Pentecost and at ordinations. It is known in English through many translations, including Come, Holy Ghost, our souls inspire; Come, Holy Ghost, Creator blest; and Creator Spirit, by whose aid. Veni Creator Spiritus was used by Gustav Mahler as the first chorale of his eighth symphony.

Another of Rabanus' hymns, Christ, the fair glory of the holy angels (Christe, sanctorum decus Angelorum), sung for the commemoration of Saint Michael and All Angels, and to include the archangels Gabriel and Raphael, is found in English translation in The Hymnal 1982 (of the Episcopal Church), and was harmonized by Ralph Vaughan Williams.

Works

Rabanus' works, many of which  remained unpublished, comprise commentaries on scripture (Genesis to Judges, Ruth, Kings, Chronicles, Judith, Esther, Canticles, Proverbs, Wisdom, Sirach, Jeremiah, Lamentations, Ezekiel, Maccabees, Matthew, the Epistles of St Paul, including Hebrews); and various treatises relating to doctrinal and practical subjects, including more than one series of homilies. In De institutione clericorum he brought into prominence the views of Augustine and Gregory the Great as to the training which was requisite for a right discharge of the clerical function. One of his most popular and enduring works is a spectacular collection of poems centered on the cross, called De laudibus sanctae crucis or In honorem sanctae crucis, a set of highly sophisticated poems that present the cross (and, in the last poem, Rabanus himself kneeling before it) in word and image, even in numbers.

Among the others may be mentioned the De universo libri xxii., sive etymologiarum opus, a kind of dictionary or encyclopedia, heavily dependent upon Isidore of Seville's Etymologies, designed as a help towards the typological, historical and mystical interpretation of Scripture, the De sacris ordinibus, the De disciplina ecclesiastica and the Martyrologium. All of them are characterized by erudition (he knew even some Greek and Hebrew). He also published an annotated version of De re militari to improve Frankish warfare.

In the annals of German philology a special interest attaches to the Glossaria Latino-Theodisca. A commentary, Super Porphyrium, printed by Cousin in 1836 among the Ouvrages inédits d'Abélard, and assigned both by that editor and by Haurau to Hrabantis Maurus, is now generally believed to have been the work of a disciple.

In 2006 Germans marked the 1150th anniversary of his death, especially in Mainz and in Fulda. Highlights of the celebrations included the display of Codex Vaticanus Reginensis latinus 124, an extremely rare loan by the Vatican to Mainz of a spectacular manuscript containing De laudibus sanctae crucis. The anniversary also saw the publication of no fewer than three book-length studies of Maurus and his work.

Marcomannic runes

A runic alphabet recorded in a treatise called De Inventione Litterarum has been ascribed to Rabanus. It consisted of a mixture of Elder Futhark with Anglo-Saxon runes and is preserved in 8th and 9th-century manuscripts mainly from the southern part of the Carolingian Empire (Alemannia, Bavaria). The manuscript text attributes the runes to the Marcomanni, quos nos Nordmannos vocamus (and hence traditionally, the alphabet is called "Marcomannic runes") but it has no connection with the Marcomanni, and rather is an attempt of Carolingian scholars to represent all letters of the Latin alphabet with runic equivalents.

Wilhelm Grimm discussed these runes in 1821.

Bibliography
The first nominally complete edition of the works of Hrabanus Maurus was that of Georges Colvener (Cologne, 6 vols. fol., 1627). The Opera omnia form vols. cvii–cxii of Migne's Patrologiae cursus completus. The De universo is the subject of Compendium der Naturwissenschaften an der Schule zu Fulda im IX. Jahrhundert (Berlin, 1880).

Recent critical editions and translations are available of some of his works:

 De sermonum proprietate sive Opus de universo, ed. and tr. by Priscilla Throop, Hrabanus Maurus: De Universo: the peculiar properties of words and their mystical significance, 2 vols. Charlotte, VT: MedievalMS, 2009.
 Expositio in Matthaeum, edited by B. Löfstedt, 2 vols. Corpus Christianorum, continuatio medievalis 174-174A. Turnhout: Brepols, 2000.
 In honorem sanctae crucis, edited by M. Perrin, 2 vols. Corpus Christianorum, continuatio medievalis 100-100A. Turnhout: Brepols, 1997.
De magicis artibus, partial English translation in European Magic and Witchcraft: a reader, tr. Martha Rampton (2018), pp. 143-45
 Martyrologium. Liber de computo, edited by J. McCulloh and W. Stevens, Corpus Christianorum, continuatio mediaevalis 44. Turnhout: Brepols, 1997.
 Hrabanus Maurus: De institutione clericorum; Studien und Edition, Freiburger Beitraege zur mittelalterlichen Geschichte 7. Frankfurt am Main: 1996. (An edition (with German translation?) of the 'De Institutione Clericorum' is listed as 'in preparation' by Brepols.)

Publications on the occasion of the 1150th anniversary of his death:
Hans-Jürgen Kotzur, ed., Rabanus Maurus: Auf den Spuren eines karolingischen Gelehrten. Mainz: Philipp von Zabern, 2006. . 120 pages, 77 color ills., 8 b/w ills. Contains full-color illustrations of Maurus's cross poems and their transcriptions and partial translations.
Stephanie Haarländer, Rabanus Maurus zum Kennenlernen: Ein Lesebuch mit einer Einführung in sein Leben und Werk. Publikationen Bistum Mainz. Darmstadt: Wissenschaftliche Buchgeselschaft, 2006. . 184 pages, many b/w ills. Collection of texts by Maurus translated into German, with extensive introduction to Maurus's life and work.
Franz J. Felten, ed., Hrabanus Maurus: Gelehrter, Abt von Fulda und Erzbischof von Mainz. Mainz: Publikationen Bistum Mainz, 2006. . 196 pages, 4 color ills. Collection of historical essays.

See also Raymund Kottje (2012) Verzeichnis der Handschriften mit den Werken des Hrabanus Maurus, Hahnsche Buchhandlung, Hannover.  (Translation: Index of Manuscripts with the Works of Hrabanus Maurus, compiled by Raymund Kottje, Professor Emeritus, University of Bonn, Germany.)

References

Sources

Opera Omnia by Migne Patrologia Latina with analytical indexes

External links

 Veni Creator Spiritus (with phonetic pronunciation)
 Come Holy Ghost, Creator Blest, Ann Blyth
 Pope Benedict XVI, "Rabanus Maurus", General Audience June 3, 2009

 
 
 

780s births
856 deaths

Year of birth uncertain
Abbots of Fulda
Frankish Benedictines
9th-century Latin writers
German beatified people
Archbishops of Mainz
Medieval Latin poets
Grammarians of Latin
Medieval linguists
Bishops in the Carolingian Empire
9th-century archbishops
9th-century Christian theologians
Benedictine bishops
Benedictine theologians
Benedictine writers
Bible commentators
Writers from the Carolingian Empire
German Roman Catholic hymnwriters
German encyclopedists
Carolingian poets
Medieval German theologians
Medieval military writers
People from the Rheingau